Alain Courtois, a Belgian Member of Parliament, announced in October 2006 that a formal bid would be made on behalf of the three Benelux countries: Belgium, the Netherlands, and Luxembourg to host either the 2018 FIFA World Cup or 2022 version, but later decided to concentrate solely on the 2018  version (see 2018 European World Cup bids).
In June 2007 the three countries launched their campaign not as a joint bid in the manner of the Korea-Japan World Cup in 2002, but emphasizing it as a common political organization.
Luxembourg would not host any matches or automatically qualify for the finals in a successful Benelux bid, but would host a FIFA congress.

Schedule

Developments
Belgium and the Netherlands registered their intention to bid jointly in March 2009. A delegation led by the presidents of the Belgian and Dutch national football associations met FIFA president Sepp Blatter on 14 November 2007, officially announcing their interest in submitting a joint bid.
On 19 March 2008 the delegation also met with UEFA President Michel Platini to convince him that it was a serious offer under one management. Afterwards they claimed to have impressed Platini, who supports the idea of getting the world cup to Europe.

FIFA tends to favour bids from single nations. In 2009, Blatter suggested that joint bids would be rejected if a suitable individual bid was available. Another factor that is against the Benelux bid is the lack of an 80,000 capacity stadium to host the final.
However, the city council of Rotterdam gave permission in March 2009 for development of a new stadium with a capacity of around 80,000 seats to be completed in time for the possible World Cup in 2018.

Belgian prime minister Yves Leterme met the mayor of the city of Brussels Freddy Thielemans and NMBS/SNCB leader  to discuss plans for a new 60,000-seater stadium in Brussels, for which there are three possibilities: the first would be to renovate and expand the current King Baudouin Stadium, the second would be to build a new stadium on the Heysel, and the third would be to build one on the property of the SNCB in the municipality of Schaerbeek. As a whole, Leterme stated that Belgium should get 4 stadia with a capacity of 40,000 together with the new 60,000-seater stadium in Brussels.
Euro 2000 was also jointly hosted by Belgium and the Netherlands.
On 23 June former French football international Christian Karembeu was presented as official counselor for the joint bid.

2018 World Cup European bids
After eventual withdrawals from both Australia, and the United States in bidding for the 2018 World Cup, and in practice with FIFA's current policy of the same continent unable to win both bids, the Belgium/Netherlands bid is effectively disqualified from eligibility for the 2022 edition.

Candidate venues
In November 2009, the venues were presented. In Belgium, matches will be played in 7 venues: Antwerp, Bruges, Brussels, Charleroi, Genk, Ghent and Liège. In the Netherlands, only five cities would host matches: Amsterdam, Eindhoven, Enschede, Heerenveen and Rotterdam, but both Amsterdam and Rotterdam will provide two stadiums. Eindhoven will function as the 'capital city' of the World Cup.

Official Bid Partners
 ING Group
 KLM Royal Dutch Airlines
 PwC
 Randstad Holding
 Royal BAM Group

See also
 Euro 2000 - An international football tournament co-hosted by Belgium and the Netherlands

References

External links
 

Belgium–Netherlands
Bid
Bid
Belgium–Netherlands relations